, abbreviated WAKHOK, is a private university in Wakkanai, Hokkaido, Japan, established in 1987.

The institution was founded as a junior college in 1987 and in 2000 became a four-year university. A Tokyo branch was opened in 2004.

In December 2020, it was announced that the school would change its name to  starting April 2022.

References

External links
 Official website 
 Official website 

Educational institutions established in 1987
Private universities and colleges in Japan
Universities and colleges in Hokkaido
1987 establishments in Japan
Wakkanai, Hokkaido